Rowing at the 2014 Asian Para Games was held at Hanam Misari Rowing Center in Incheon, South Korea, from October 20 to 21, 2014. Two gold medals were awarded.

Medal summary

Medal table

Medalists

Participating nations
A total of 27 athletes from 4 nations competed in rowing at the 2014 Asian Para Games:

Results

Men's Single Sculls

Heat
October 20

Final
October 21

Mixed Double Sculls

Heat
October 20

Final
October 21

References

External links
 Rowing by sport

2014 Asian Para Games events